Gerard Ferdinand Desjardins (born July 22, 1944) is a Canadian former ice hockey goaltender who played in the National Hockey League (NHL) for the Los Angeles Kings, Chicago Blackhawks, New York Islanders, and Buffalo Sabres, and also played one season for the Michigan Stags in the World Hockey Association (WHA). Desjardins' career ended after a puck struck his eye in 1977, which led many NHL goalies to switch from fibreglass facemasks toward the cage and helmet style. Many amateur and junior hockey leagues subsequently banned fibreglass masks altogether, and began mandating the helmet/cage combination.

Career statistics

Regular season and playoffs

External links

References 

1944 births
Baltimore Blades players
Buffalo Sabres players
Chicago Blackhawks players
Franco-Ontarian people
Houston Apollos players
Ice hockey people from Ontario
Living people
Los Angeles Kings players
Michigan Stags players
New York Islanders players
People from Sudbury District
Canadian ice hockey goaltenders